Salient is the weekly students' magazine of the Victoria University of Wellington Students' Association (VUWSA) at Victoria University of Wellington, New Zealand. Salient was established in 1938 and originally published in newspaper format, but is now published as a magazine. Salient's style and editorial position can change from year to year due to changes in editors. However, the magazine has generally taken a left-wing stance.

Organisation

Origins 
The student magazine of Victoria University of Wellington has been published under a number of different titles since the early twentieth century: Spike (1902–1964), Smad (1930–1937), and finally Salient (1938–present).

Salient was originally published in newspaper format, but is now published as a print magazine and online

Editor
The Salient editor-in-chief is an employee of VUWSA operating under a charter that grants editorial independence. The editor is appointed and employed under a fixed term contract that covers roughly the beginning to end of the academic year. Previous involvement with the magazine is not a prerequisite for applicants, although most have had some role at Salient prior to their editorship. At various times in Salient's history, and consistently since 2011, the editorship has been shared between two people.

Notable past editors include former Prime Minister Geoffrey Palmer, editor of Metro magazine Simon Wilson, independent publisher Roger Steele (NZOM), Queen's Counsel Hugh Rennie, independent investigative writers such as David Harcourt and New Zealand Listener writer Toby Manhire.

Former editors

News

Salient news is predominately focused on student issues, the students' association, and the university itself. However, Salient has also reported on national and international items outside of "student" issues. For instance there was significant coverage of the Iraq invasion in 2003. 

Previous news editors

 Zoë Mills and Ethan Manera (2023)
 Beth Mountford and Azaria Howell (2022)
 Sophie Boot (2014)
 Chris McIntyre (2013)
 Stella Blake-Kelly and Hugo McKinnon (2011)
 Molly McCarthy (2010)
 Michael Oliver (2009)
 Seonah Choi (2008)
 Laura McQuillan (2007)
 Nicola Kean (2006)
 Keith Ng (2004–2005)

Salient is a member of the Aotearoa Student Press Association (ASPA), which has intermittently had a press gallery journalist in the New Zealand House of Representatives. The current press gallery representative is Annabel McCarthy.

Design

Salient employs a full-time designer who is responsible for the look of the magazine. Because the designer is typically employed for only a one-year term, the visual aesthetic of the magazine can change significantly from year to year.

Former designers

Comics
Salient has been a home to a number of comics and cartoons, and they traditionally have their place on the last page of the magazine. 
Past comics such as ASCII and Grant Buist's Brunswick have won critical awards, with ASCII winning an Aotearoa Student Press Association (ASPA) award in 2005. Previous comics have included Being Blind, Man, ASCII (originally published in Waikato University's [[Nexus (student magazine)|Nexus' magazine']]), Newtown Ghetto Anger, The Chronicle, Drunk Duck, Uni Life, Super Academic Friends, The Academic Idol Comic, and G33K by Sparx.

Website
As well as publishing in print, Salient operates a frequently updated website. In 2013, the Salient website was redeveloped, and won the award for best website at the ASPAs. Salient publishes an email newsletter called 'Sincerely Salient', including news round-ups, local events, and feature highlights.

In late 2019, Salient's archives were controversially removed from public view after a website upgrade, resulting in the creation of an independent Salient Archive' website, which restored public access to 9,879 of the hidden articles.

 Video Salient had a video production arm called 'Salient TV', the only department dedicated to video content from any student media publication in New Zealand. Salient TV videos include interviews, comedy sketches, and other miscellaneous content that focuses on student interests. Salient TV videos were primarily found on the magazine's Facebook page. Salient TV disbanded in 2019, to widespread disappointment.

Radio station

Salient FM, known as VBC until 2015, was a non-profit station which operated at Victoria University of Wellington from 2007-2019. It took the place of Radio Active as the university's campus-based and student-oriented radio station. It was funded by the university and VUWSA through the budget allocated for Salient, and also had advertisers and sponsors.

In October 2013, VUWSA held a referendum asking whether it should cease funding the station from 2014 after a student moved a motion requesting a referendum at VUWSA's AGM. Out of the 2,105 votes cast on the question, 61 percent favoured continuing to fund the VBC.

As of May 2014, VUWSA President Sonya Clark had been made a trustee of the defunct VBC Trust in order to wind it down, so that VUWSA could take control of the station. The Trust owed IRD about $3,000 in unpaid tax, which Clark said VUWSA intended to pay. The 2014 Salient editors expressed an interest in transforming the VBC into "Salient Radio". In 2015, the station was rebranded Salient FM.

Salient FM had a diverse programme targeted at Victoria University of Wellington students. Genres of alternative, electronic, and hip-hop music were most commonly broadcast. The station also heavily encouraged Wellingtonian and New Zealand musical acts.  The station also hosted a number of politics and current affairs focused shows, notably the Young Matt Show and Bandwagon Radio. These programmes discussed important political issues and policies, particularly those most relevant to VUW students.

In December 2019, Salient FM was shut down following a decision from the VUWSA CEO Matthew Tucker. Full reasoning behind the Salient FMs discontinuation was not made public. In response to this, an Official Investigation Act request was filed to investigate if cutting the station was unconstitutional. Salient FM's two editors Jazz Kane and Nav Nair commented "We're pretty confident that it is entirely unconstitutional".

 Podcasts 
After the cessation of Salient FM, Salient created Salient Podcasts.

ASPA AwardsSalient has participated in the ASPA Student Media Awards since their inception in 2003. The magazine dominated the first two years of the awards winning amongst other categories Best Publication in 2003 and 2004. Otago's Critic is generally seen as Salient's strongest competition and in 2005 turned the tables, sweeping a number of categories including Best Publication with Salient coming second. Critic won Best Publication again in 2006 and Salient came second.

In 2009, Salient won the award for Best Publication. Salient dominated these awards with five first places and eight other placings. In 2011, Salient also won best publication. However, in 2010, 2012 and 2013 Salient was runner-up in best publication to Critic.

In 2022, Salient won awards for Best Cover, Best Sports Writing, Best Personal Essay, Best Online Presence, Best Centrefold, Best Student Politics Coverage (tied) and Best Editorial (tied).

Views
Due to Salients changing editorial position (each editor typically holding the position for a one-year period), views expressed in the magazine have been varying throughout history. In general, Salient has taken a left-wing approach to politics.

 Maoism (1964-1981) 
In this period, many of the editors and contributors to Salient were were members of the Wellington Marxist-Leninist Organisation (MILO), a Maoist-aligned group with substantial student membership at the time. Consequently, much of the content published in this period was politically charged and Maoist-leaning.Max Nichol. "An ‘Organ of Student Opinion’? Alternative Print, Protest, and the Politics of Education in Salient, 1973-1989". 2019. Victoria University of Wellington. Thesis. https://researcharchive.vuw.ac.nz/xmlui/bitstream/handle/10063/8544/thesis_access.pdf?sequence=1p. 43.

 Te Ao Mārama (1973-1974, and 1997-present) 
Te Ao Mārama is an issue of Salient focused on Māori issues. Young political groups Ngā Tamatoa and the Te Reo Māori Society influenced the first publication of Te Ao Mārama in 1973 during Māori Language Week, under editor Roger Steele in 1973, in an attempt to support te reo Māori on campus. According to Max Nichol, "Steele credits the Te Reo Māori Society with the idea, and Ngā Tamatoa with putting the issue of revitalising te reo on the agenda in the first place." Unfortunately, Steele’s editing successors did not continue this mahi to the same degree; "it was not until 1997 that Te Ao Mārama was enshrined in VUWSA’s constitution, obliging Salient to produce a Māori language issue annually."

Presently, Te Ao Mārama is a cherished tradition that allows a voice to Māori voices and issues within the university community. In 2022, Te Ao Mārama was published for the first time entirely in both English and te reo. This was under editor Janhavi Gosavi, and the issue was guest edited by Areta Pakinga.

 Women's rights 
In the 1980s, Salient began to gave more space to issues of women's rights. Notably in this time, Sally Zwartz became the second women editor in 1984, the only women to edit previously being Shirley Grinlington in 1941, of who it is speculated to "perhaps [have] gained her position due to the dip in the number of male students during World War Two."

 Gay and lesbian liberation 

 Notable History 

 1985 Defamement allegations and sexual harassment policy 
1985 editor Jane Hurley faced a legal threat from the university's History Department after she had co-edited the VUWSA Student Handbook, which "provided course critiques so that students could assess for themselves which courses and programmes of study might appeal to them." The handbook noted that a professor in the department was known for “sexual harassment," causing the department to threaten a defamation suit against the editors and demand retraction. In the first issue of Salient in 1985, Hurley attempted to appease the department by writing that the claims of "sexual harassment" may have suggested a higher level of severity, and clarified the misconduct to be "milder" forms of harassment such as "unwanted comments, the innuendo, the disparagement of women simply because they are women."

Hurley's reporting was partly responsible for pushing Victoria University to enforce a sexual harassment policy in 1986, and work to give students support around the issue.

1995 Waghorn affair
In 1995, there was controversy surrounding the editor Vic Waghorn, such that a Special General Meeting of VUWSA was called in June to dismiss her from the role. The motion to dismiss Waghorn at the meeting was soundly defeated 250 to 3, but it was not the end of the matter. Personal grievances and accusations she had misappropriated funds led to her being suspended in September by the VUWSA Executive. In response, Waghorn managed to change the cover of the final issue of Salient "to a cartoon depiction of cunnilingus captioned 'suck it hard'". Most of the covers were removed before release however.

The affair led to a change to the VUWSA constitution so that it would be harder to dismiss a Salient editor in the future.

2005 Fee rise leak and court injunction
In September 2005, the Vice-Chancellor of Victoria University obtained a court injunction to prevent an issue of Salient from being distributed – thought to be the first time in the magazine's history this has happened. The issue of Salient contained information obtained from leaked University Council documents with details about possible university fee increases of 5 to 10 percent. The controversy made national media, with several items on the television news. The university failed to realise that information was put on to the ASPA newswire, hence the information was published in several other student magazines and on the internet. Distribution of Salient was eventually allowed, four days late after Salient and the university reached an out-of-court settlement. The documents were returned to the university, reportedly with pictures of male genitalia drawn over them.

2006 Listing of Chinese people as a species to be wary of
In April 2006, Salient published a short piece which put Han Chinese people, along with animals like poisonous snakes and penguins, in a list of "top five species we should be wary of". The supposed "joke" upset the Chinese community and caused huge protests from both Chinese students and the Chinese Embassy. Accused of being blatantly racist, editor James Robinson apologised, saying "It was a ridiculous jab that was honestly so stupid I didn't even think twice about it." However, he argued people who were offended had misinterpreted it: "We put 'the Chinese' between 'penguins' and 'very poisonous snakes' on the list, and people somehow took it seriously." He also defended his right to publish it, saying "It's not hate speech or inciting violence against the Chinese race. It would be a dangerous precedent to come out and say, 'Sorry, we were totally out of our minds to print such a thing'." Many questioned Robinson's credentials in defining what is and is not an appropriate reaction to racism. Nick Kelly, 2006 Students' Association President, posted an apology calling the article "xenophobic and inappropriate ... in poor taste".

2008 Naked Hu Jintao cover
In May 2008, Salient published a feature article concerning the rise of China as a new world superpower. To promote this article the cover that week depicted a naked, yet to be identified, Salient staffer draped in a Chinese flag, with Hu Jintao's face photoshopped onto their own. The cover invoked a strong reaction from the Wellington Chinese community, with  students removing the magazine from distribution at the University's Karori Campus. Following this disruption, the Chinese Students' Association of Victoria University presented a petition of 133 signatures calling for an apology. To date, Salient has not apologised.

2009 Lundy 500

In July 2009, Salient editor Jackson Wood courted controversy by announcing the "Lundy 500", an event whereby "teams of vehicles ... [would] travel from Petone to Palmerston North as convicted double murderer Mark Lundy did in 2000, before murdering wife Christine and daughter Amber, according to the prosecution at his 2002 trial." Participants were tasked with doing the trip in 68 minutes or less, the same time Lundy is argued to have driven the distance. Wood argued that the "event was designed to draw attention to some of the inconsistencies in the New Zealand legal system", and emphasised that he wasn't encouraging anyone to break the law. However, the proposed event was harshly criticised in the media, and on 2 August, it was announced that the event was to be cancelled. Wood apologised to the Lundy family and wrote that: "He acknowledged that their viewpoints were not adequately taken into account before the event was announced on Friday, and that there were other ways for this point to be communicated".

A similar re-enactment of the travel involved in the Lundy case, dubbed the "Lundy Three Hundy" was proposed in 2013 by Nic Miller. It was likewise criticised in the media, with Mathew Grocott writing that "this event should not go ahead and if those involved have any human decency then it won't go ahead."

See also
 List of print media in New Zealand
 List of student newspapers

References

External links
 
 Historic issues of Salient, provided by the New Zealand Electronic Text Centre
 List of historical student magazines published at Victoria University, provided by the New Zealand Electronic Text Centre
 Article about a 2012 reunion in The Dominion Post''

Magazines published in New Zealand
Student magazines
Student newspapers published in New Zealand
Victoria University of Wellington
Mass media in Wellington
Magazines established in 1938
Weekly magazines published in New Zealand
1938 establishments in New Zealand